Darko Naseski (born 16 November 1979) is a Macedonian sports shooter. He competed in the men's 10 metre air rifle event at the 1996 Summer Olympics.

References

1979 births
Living people
Macedonian male sport shooters
Olympic shooters of North Macedonia
Shooters at the 1996 Summer Olympics
Place of birth missing (living people)